Lake Calero is an artificial lake about  southeast of Rancho Cordova, California in the United States.

The lake is formed by Calero Dam, built in 1982 across Crevis Creek. Its waters reach the San Francisco Bay by way of Deer Creek, the Cosumnes River, the Mokelumne River, and the Sacramento River.

Calero Dam 
It is owned by the Rancho Murieta
Community Services District.

See also 
 List of lakes in California
 List of reservoirs and dams in California

References 

Dams completed in 1982
Dams in California
Calero
Calero
1982 establishments in California
Calero